Trupanea shaula is a species of tephritid or fruit flies in the genus Tephritis of the family Tephritidae.

Distribution
Pakistan.

References

Tephritinae
Insects described in 1975
Diptera of Asia